Stolen Summer is a 2002 drama film about a Catholic boy who befriends a terminally ill Jewish boy and tries to convert him, believing that it is the only way the Jewish boy will get to Heaven.  Directed by first time writer/director Pete Jones, Stolen Summer is the first film produced for Project Greenlight, an independent film competition created by Ben Affleck and Matt Damon, and sponsored by HBO.  Project Greenlight aired on HBO as a documentary series chronicling the selection of Jones's script from approximately seven thousand entries, and the production of the film in Chicago in 2001.

The film's casting department considered the casting of the Jewish Adi Stein as the Catholic Pete O'Malley, an ironic joke due to the characters attempting to convert a Jewish boy to Catholicism.

Cast
 Adi Stein as Pete O'Malley
 Mike Weinberg as Danny Jacobsen
 Aidan Quinn as Joe O'Malley
 Bonnie Hunt as Margaret O'Malley
 Kevin Pollak as Rabbi Jacobsen
 Brian Dennehy as Father Kelly
 Ryan Jonathan Kelley as Seamus O'Malley
 Eddie Kaye Thomas as Patrick O'Malley
 Will Malnati as Eddie O'Malley

Box office
The domestic total gross for the film was $134,726.  Production costs were $1.8 million.

References

External links

 

2002 films
2002 drama films
American drama films
Films produced by Ben Affleck
Films produced by Matt Damon
Miramax films
2000s English-language films
2000s American films
2002 directorial debut films